A legal case is in a general sense a dispute between opposing parties which may be resolved by a court, or by some equivalent legal process. A legal case is typically based on either civil or criminal law. In most legal cases there are one or more accusers and one or more defendants. In some instances, a legal case may occur between parties that are not in opposition, but require a legal ruling to formally establish some legal fact, such as a divorce.

Civil case
A civil case, more commonly known as a lawsuit or controversy, begins when a plaintiff files most a document called a complaint with a court, informing the court of the wrong that the plaintiff has allegedly suffered because of the defendant, and requesting a remedy. The remedy sought may be money, an injunction, which requires the defendant to perform or refrain from performing some action, or a declaratory judgment, which determines that the plaintiff has certain legal rights. The remedy will be prescribed by the court if the plaintiff wins the case. A civil case can also be arbitrated through arbitration, which may result in a faster settlement, with lower costs, than could be obtained by going through a trial.

The plaintiff must make a genuine effort to inform the defendant of the case through service of process, by which the plaintiff delivers to the defendant the same documents that the plaintiff filed with the court.

At any point during the case, the parties can agree to a settlement, which will end the case, although in some circumstances, such as in class actions, a settlement requires court approval in order to be binding.

Family case
Cases involving separation including asset division, support (a.k.a. maintenance or alimony), and matters related to children are handled differently in different jurisdictions. Often, the court's procedure for dealing with family cases is very similar to that of a civil case (it requires service and disclosure, and will issue judgments).

Divorce and separation from a spouse is one of the most stressful situations, as rated by the Holmes and Rahe Stress Scale, and so family proceedings are increasingly being "divorced" from the often very formal and impersonal process of civil proceedings, and given special treatment.

Criminal case

A criminal case, in common law jurisdictions, begins when a person suspected of a crime is indicted by a grand jury or otherwise charged with the offense by a government official called a prosecutor or district attorney.

A criminal case may in some jurisdictions be settled before a trial through a plea bargain. Typically, in a plea bargain, the defendant agrees to plead guilty to a lesser charge than that which was originally brought by the grand jury or prosecutor. A defendant who goes to trial risks greater penalties than would normally be imposed through a plea bargain.

Common elements
Legal cases, whether criminal or civil, are premised on the idea that a dispute will be fairly resolved when a legal procedure exists by which the dispute can be brought to a factfinder not otherwise involved in the case, who can evaluate evidence to determine the truth with respect to claims of guilt, innocence, liability, or lack of fault. Details of the procedure may depend on both the kind of case and the kind of system in which the case is brought – whether, for example, it is an inquisitorial system or a solo

Designation and citation

In most systems, the governing body responsible for overseeing the courts assigns a unique number/letter combination or similar designation to each case in order to track the various disputes that are or have been before it. The outcome of the case is recorded, and can later be reviewed by obtaining a copy of the documents associated with the designation previously assigned to the case.

However, it is often more convenient to refer to casesparticularly landmark and other notable casesby a title of the form Claimant v Defendant (e.g. Arkell v Pressdram).  Where a legal proceeding does not have formally designated adverse parties, a form such as In re, Re or In the matter of is used (e.g. In re Gault).  The "v" separating the parties is an abbreviation of the Latin versus, but, when spoken in Commonwealth countries, it is normally rendered as "and" or "against" (as in, for example, Charles Dickens' Jarndyce and Jarndyce).  Where it is considered necessary to protect the anonymity of a natural person, some cases may have one or both parties replaced by a standard pseudonym (Jane Roe in Roe v. Wade) or by an initial (D v D).  In titles such as R v Adams, however, the initial "R" is usually an abbreviation for the Latin Rex or Regina, i.e. for the Crown. (For an explanation of other terms that may appear in case titles, see the Glossary of legal terms.)

See also
Case law
Early case assessment
Lists of case law

References

External links

Legal disputes
Case law